In probability theory, Kolmogorov's inequality is a so-called "maximal inequality" that gives a bound on the probability that the partial sums of a finite collection of independent random variables exceed some specified bound.

Statement of the inequality
Let X1, ..., Xn : Ω → R be independent random variables defined on a common probability space (Ω, F, Pr), with expected value E[Xk] = 0 and variance Var[Xk] < +∞ for k = 1, ..., n. Then, for each λ > 0,

where Sk = X1 + ... + Xk.

The convenience of this result is that we can bound the worst case deviation of a random walk at any point of time using its value at the end of time interval.

Proof
The following argument employs discrete martingales. 
As argued in the discussion of Doob's martingale inequality, the sequence  is a martingale.
Define  as follows. Let , and

for all .
Then  is also a martingale. 

Applying this result to the martingale , we have

where the first inequality follows by Chebyshev's inequality.

This inequality was generalized by Hájek and Rényi in 1955.

See also
 Chebyshev's inequality
 Etemadi's inequality
 Landau–Kolmogorov inequality
 Markov's inequality
 Bernstein inequalities (probability theory)

References
  (Theorem 22.4)
 
 

Stochastic processes
Probabilistic inequalities
Articles containing proofs